Dunedin Technical (known locally as Tech) is a semi-professional association football club in Dunedin, New Zealand. They compete in the ODT FootballSouth Premier League and were the 2018 ODT FootballSouth Premier League champions.

Club history
The club was founded as King Edward Technical College Old Boys in 1920, and changed their name to Dunedin Technical in 1980. They and are based at Culling Park, in the suburb of Saint Kilda.

The club has regularly reached the later stages of the Chatham Cup (New Zealand's premier knockout football competition), and have reached the final on four occasions, in each of which they have met a team from Auckland. Their sole win was in 1999, when they beat Waitakere City FC 4–0. They were losing finalists in 1964 (under their former name), 1998, and 2008.

Their respective women's team have won the Kingsgate Women's Premier League for the 2013, 2014, 2015, 2016, 2017, 2018 seasons, also reaching the quarter finals of the National Women's Knockout Cup on two occasions, semi finals in 2017, and winning the Kate Sheppard Cup (previously known as Knockout Cup) against Forrest Hill Milford in 2018.

Dunedin Technical's best season in the New Zealand National Soccer League was in 2000, when they finished third. The previous year they had reached the final of the national league competition, which at that time was run as separate North and South Island leagues, followed by a final between the winners of these two leagues.

Prior to the creation of a national league in 1970, King Edward Technical College Old Boys were Otago regional champions in 1934, 1955, 1957, and 1963.

President
Andrew Douglas

Vice President
Tony Roach

Treasurer
Pete Mccall

Secretary
Cathryn Elsworth

Club Captain & Sponsor Liaison
Matthew Bray

Maintenance
Matthew Bray

Male Football Liaison
Michael Neaverson

Junior Coordinator
Tony Boomer

Events coordinator
Tony Roach

Grants:
Gavin Wheeler

General:
Joe Cole
Graeme Smaill
Karen Johnston	
Justin Flaws
Aaron Burgess
David Hayman

Notable players

 Andrew Boyens
 Sam Jasper
 Neil Jones
 Graham Marshall
 Emily Morison
 Lutz Pfannenstiel
 Blair Scoullar

References

External links 
 Club home page
 Dunedin Technical's club record at ultimatenzsoccer.com

Association football clubs in Dunedin
Association football clubs established in 1920
1920 establishments in New Zealand